German submarine U-23 was a Type IIB U-boat of Nazi Germany's Kriegsmarine, built in Germaniawerft, Kiel. She was laid down on 11 April 1936 and commissioned on 24 September.

Design
German Type IIB submarines were enlarged versions of the original Type IIs. U-23 had a displacement of  when at the surface and  while submerged. She had two shafts and two  propellers.

U-23 was fitted with three  torpedo tubes at the bow, five torpedoes or up to twelve Type A torpedo mines, and a  anti-aircraft gun. The boat had a complement of twentyfive.

Service history

In 16 patrols U-23 sank seven ships for a total of  including two warships, as well as damaging a warship and an auxiliary warship.

Over the course of her service with the Kriegsmarine, U-23 had ten commanding officers, the most famous of whom was Kapitänleutnant Otto Kretschmer, who went on to become the top scoring U-boat ace. After service in the Atlantic with the 1st U-boat Flotilla, U-23 served as a training boat with the 21st U-boat Flotilla from July 1940 until September 1942. U-23 was then transported in sections along the Danube to the Romanian port of Galați. She was then re-assembled by the Romanians at the Galați shipyard and sent to the Black Sea port of Constanţa, Romania, with the 30th U-boat Flotilla until September 1944.

Fate
U-23 was scuttled by her crew on 10 September 1944, off the coast of Turkey in the Black Sea at position  to prevent her capture by the advancing Soviets.

Summary of raiding history

References

Notes

Citations

Bibliography

External links

German Type II submarines
U-boats commissioned in 1936
U-boats scuttled in 1944
World War II submarines of Germany
World War II shipwrecks in the Black Sea
1936 ships
Ships built in Kiel
Ships built in Romania
Maritime incidents in September 1944